Hari is a color adjective with strong religious symbolism in Hindu religion.

Hari may also refer to:

Religion

A name of Vishnu
A generic name of God in Hindu monotheism
A word for "day" in various languages in the Indian cultural sphere, and as such part of the name of a number of festivals
Hari Raya Idul Fiotri, name of Eid al-Fitr in Southeast Asian Islam
Hari Raya Haji, name of Eid al-Adha in Southeast Asian Islam

Name

As a given name 
Hari (director), Indian film director
Hari Kondabolu (born 1982), Indian American comedian
Hari Sreenivasan (born 1974), Hindi-American journalist

As a surname
Badr Hari (born 1984), professional Dutch-Moroccan Heavyweight kickboxer and martial artist
Johann Hari (born 1979), British journalist
Mata Hari (1876–1917), born Margaretha Geertruida Zelle, Dutch World War I spy
Vani Hari (born 1979), American author and activist known for her criticism of the food industry

Toponymy
Hari, the Hungarian name for Heria village, Fărău Commune, Alba County, Romania
Hari, Iran, a village in Sistan and Baluchestan Province, Iran
Hari River, Afghanistan, Afghanistan , Iran and Turkmenistan

Fiction and popular culture
Hari (singer) (born 1990), stage name of Jeong Sung-kyung, a South Korean singer
Hari Seldon, the fictional founder of psychohistory
Hari, the name of a character in the anime series Inuyasha
Hari Mata Hari, a famous and popular Bosnian group
Hajrudin "Hari" Varešanović, vocal soloist, composer, and leader of the musical group Hari Mata Hari
Hari (actor), Indian Malayalam film actor and dubbing artist
Hari Koo, a protagonist in the anime series 
Hari (film), a 2018 Nepalese film